Hanns Grössel (18 April 1932, in Leipzig – 1 August 2012, in Cologne) was a German literary translator and broadcasting journalist.

Biography
He translated from Swedish, Danish, and French. He was also well known from his activities at the Westdeutscher Rundfunk.

Translations 
 Peter Adolphsen: Brummstein, München [u.a.] 2005
 Peter Adolphsen: Das Herz des Urpferds, München 2008
 Jacques Berg: Herbst in der Provence, Zürich [u.a.] 1980
 Cecil Bødker: Der Widder, Einsiedeln 1966
 Cecil Bødker: Zustand Harley, Frankfurt a.M. 1969
 Jean Cau: Das Erbarmen Gottes, München 1962
 Inger Christensen: Alfabet, Münster 1988
 Inger Christensen: Azorno, Frankfurt am Main 1972
 Inger Christensen: Brev i april, Münster 1990
 Inger Christensen: Ein chemisches Gedicht zu Ehren der Erde, Salzburg [u.a.] 1997
 Inger Christensen: Det, Münster 2002
 Inger Christensen: Gedicht vom Tod, Münster 1991
 Inger Christensen: Der Geheimniszustand und das "Gedicht vom Tod", München [u.a.] 1999
 Inger Christensen: Das gemalte Zimmer, Münster 1989
 Inger Christensen: Graes, Münster 2010
 Inger Christensen: Lys, Münster 2008
 Inger Christensen: Massenhaft Schnee für die darbenden Schafe, Wien 2002
 Inger Christensen: Das Schmetterlingstal, Frankfurt am Main 1998
 Inger Christensen: Teil des Labyrinths, Münster 1993
 Dänische Erzähler der Gegenwart, Stuttgart 1970
 Petru Dumitriu: Treffpunkt Jüngstes Gericht, Frankfurt a.M. [u.a.] 1962
 Sten Forshufvud: Mord an Napoleon?, Düsseldorf [u.a.] 1962 (übersetzt zusammen mit Margarete Bormann)
 Ulrikka S. Gernes: Wo Schmetterlinge überwintern können, Berlin 2009
 Roger Gouze: Venus im Weinberg, München 1962
 Marcel Griaule: Masken der Dogon, Frankfurt am Main [u.a.] 1980
 Lars Gustafsson: Utopien, München 1970 (übersetzt zusammen mit Hans Magnus Enzensberger)
 José Maria de Heredia: Der Mensch lauscht ungerührt, Pforzheim 1983
 Sven Holm: Termush, Atlantik-Küste, Frankfurt a.M. 1970
 Søren Kierkegaard: Der Augenblick, Nördlingen 1988
 Paul Léautaud: Literarisches Tagebuch 1893–1956, Reinbek b. Hamburg 1966
 Harry Mathews: Roussel und Venedig, Berlin 1991
 Leif Panduro: Echsentage, Neuwied [u.a.] 1964
 Leif Panduro: Fern aus Dänemark, Frankfurt am Main 1972
 André Pieyre de Mandiargues: Die Monstren von Bomarzo, Reinbek b. Hamburg 1969
 André Pieyre de Mandiargues: Das Motorrad, Reinbek b. Hamburg 1965
 Lucien Rebatet: Weder Gott noch Teufel, München [u.a.] 1964
 Klaus Rifbjerg: Der schnelle Tag ist hin, Würzburg [u.a.] 1962
 Raymond Roussel: In Havanna. Als Kanevas gedachte Dokumente, Frankfurt am Main 1982
 Raymond Roussel: Nouvelles impressions d’Afrique, München 1980
 Jean-Paul Sartre: Paris unter der Besatzung, Reinbek bei Hamburg 1980
 Staffan Seeberg: Der Lungenfisch, Frankfurt am Main 1973
 Georges Simenon: Der Bürgermeister von Furnes, Zürich 1984
 Georges Simenon: Die Witwe Couderc, Zürich 1982
 Villy Sørensen: Apolls Aufruhr, München 1991
 Villy Sørensen: Vormundserzählungen, Frankfurt a.M. 1968
 Jørgen Sonne: Gedichte, Heidelberg 1996
 Tomas Tranströmer: Einunddreißig Gedichte, Stade 2002
 Tomas Tranströmer: Die Erinnerungen sehen mich, München [u.a.] 1999
 als Hörbuch, gelesen von Michael Krüger, Hörbuch Verlag, Hamburg 2011, 2 CD, 109 min. . 
 Tomas Tranströmer: Für Lebende und Tote, München [u.a.] 1993
 Tomas Tranströmer: Gedichte, München [u.a.] 1981
 Tomas Tranströmer: Das große Rätsel, München [u.a.] 2005
 Tomas Tranströmer: Der Mond und die Eiszeit, München [u.a.] 1992
 Tomas Tranströmer: Sämtliche Gedichte, München [u.a.] 1997
 Tomas Tranströmer: Schmetterlingsmuseum, Leipzig 1992
 Tomas Tranströmer: Der wilde Marktplatz, München [u.a.] 1985
 Leonora Christina Ulfeldt: Jammers Minde, München 1968
 Poul Vad: Islandreise, München [u.a.] 1998
 Boris Vian: Die kapieren nicht, Frankfurt am Main 1980

Awards 
 Petrarca-Preis (1993)
 Preis der Stadt Münster für Europäische Poesie (1995)
 Europäischer Übersetzerpreis Offenburg (2010)

References

External links
 
 Nachruf von Andreas Rossmann, FAZ

Danish–German translators
French–German translators
Swedish–German translators
20th-century German translators
German journalists
German male journalists
1932 births
2012 deaths
Writers from Leipzig
20th-century German male writers
German male non-fiction writers
Westdeutscher Rundfunk people